Itamuro Onsen Daikokuya is a traditional ryokan with restaurant in Nasushiobara city, Japan founded in 1551. Itamuro Onsen is a historic area and its hot springs are known from 1059. Since then onsen has been highly-sought after for its curing effects and a high natural water quality. In 1551 was founded as "Daikokuya Ryokan" and for generations it is popular for visitors to relax and enjoy hot springs, art collection, nature, and fine food.

Hot spring source temperature ranges from 38º to 45º Celsius, and is suitable also for guests unaccustomed to hot baths. Available is an open-air bath, a stone bath, and a wooden bath. Itamuro Onsen has been recognized as a “National Health Spa” by the Ministry of the Environment in 1971.

See also 
List of oldest companies

References 

Article contains translated text from 板室温泉大黒屋 on the Japanese Wikipedia retrieved on 25 February 2017.

External links 
Homepage
Location on Google Maps

Hotels in Tochigi Prefecture
Restaurants in Japan
Companies based in Tochigi Prefecture
Companies established in the 16th century
1550s establishments in Japan
Restaurants established in the 16th century
Hotels established in the 16th century
Ryokan